Asian Highway 19 (AH19) is a road in the Asian Highway Network running 459 km from Nakhon Ratchasima to Bangkok in Thailand. This highway connects Nakhon Ratchasima to Bangkok via  port city of Laem Chabang.

Thailand
The route connects these cities Nakhon Ratchasima - Kabinburi -  Chonburi - Bangkok of Thailand.

  Route 304 : Pru Yai (Nakhon Ratchasima) - Phanom Sarakham
  Route 331 : Khao Hin Son - Nern Pha Suk
  Route 7 : Lam Cha Bung Port -  Sri Nakarin Rd. (Bangkok)

Junctions
  Nakhon Ratchasima
  Kabinburi
  Bangkok

See also
 List of Asian Highways

References

External links
  Treaty on Asian Highways with routes

Asian Highway Network
Roads in Thailand